John Toal may refer to:

 John Toal (broadcaster), BBC Radio Ulster and BBC Radio 3 presenter
 John Toal (footballer), retired Shamrock Rovers midfielder